Diocese of Curitiba may refer to the following ecclesiastical jurisdictions with see in Curitiba, Brazil :

 the former suffragan Roman Catholic Diocese of Curitiba, now promoted to Metropolitan Archdiocese of Curitiba
 the present Anglican Diocese of Curitiba